Lynette Smith (born 1950) is an Australian former cricketer who played as a right-handed batter. She appeared in six One Day Internationals for International XI at the 1973 World Cup. She played domestic cricket for Western Australia.

References

External links
 
 

Living people
1950 births
Australian women cricketers
International XI women One Day International cricketers
Western Australia women cricketers